Georgi Tamazovich Dzhikiya ( born 21 November 1993) is a Russian professional footballer, who plays as a centre-back for Spartak Moscow in the Russian Premier League and the Russia national team.

Early life
Dzhikiya was born on 21 November 1993 in Moscow, Russia. Ethnic Georgians, his family had previously moved from Sukhumi, Abkhazia.

Club career
He made his debut in the Russian Second Division for FC Lokomotiv-2 Moscow on 24 May 2011 in a game against FC Volochanin-Ratmir Vyshny Volochyok.

On 26 December 2016, he signed a contract with FC Spartak Moscow.

On 18 January 2018, he suffered an ACL tear that kept him from playing until August 2018, he was forced to miss the 2018 FIFA World Cup that was held in Russia.

On 15 August 2021, he extended his contract with Spartak until 31 May 2024, with an additional one-year extension option.

International career
In November 2016, he was called up to the Russia national football team for the first time for the friendly games against Qatar on 10 November 2016 and Romania on 15 November 2016. He made his debut on 5 June 2017 in a friendly against Hungary.

In the 2017 FIFA Confederations Cup, he spent all three matches without substitutions - against New Zealand (2–0), Portugal (0–1) and Mexico (1–2). In the game with the Portuguese, he received a yellow card.

He missed the 2018 FIFA World Cup, which Russia hosted, due to injury.

On 16 November 2019 he scored his first goal for the national team in the Euro 2020 qualifier against Belgium.

On 11 May 2021, he was included in the preliminary extended 30-man squad for UEFA Euro 2020. On 2 June 2021, he was included in the final squad. He played the full match in all three of Russia's games as Russia was eliminated at group stage.

Career statistics

Club

International

Scores and results list Russia's goal tally first, score column indicates score after each Dzhikiya goal.

Honours

Club
Spartak Moscow
Russian Premier League: 2016–17
Russian Cup: 2021–22
Russian Super Cup: 2017

Individual
Spartak Moscow Supporters' Golden Boar Award: 2019

Notes
 Abkhazia, whilst de facto independent, was at the time recognised as part of Georgia by the United Nations and all of its members (Its independence was later recognised by Russia, Nicaragua, Venezuela, Nauru and Syria).

References

1993 births
Footballers from Moscow
Russian people of Georgian descent
Living people
Russian footballers
Russia international footballers
Association football defenders
FC Lokomotiv Moscow players
PFC Spartak Nalchik players
FC Khimik Dzerzhinsk players
FC Amkar Perm players
FC Spartak Moscow players
Russian Premier League players
Russian First League players
Russian Second League players
2017 FIFA Confederations Cup players
UEFA Euro 2020 players